Licodia Eubea is a town and comune in the Metropolitan City of Catania, on the island of Sicily, southern Italy. It is bounded by the comuni of Caltagirone, Chiaramonte Gulfi, Giarratana, Grammichele, Mazzarrone, Mineo, Monterosso Almo and Vizzini.

Situated above a hill overlooking the valley of the Dirillo river, Licodia Eubea boasts a rich production of olives, almonds, citrus fruits, and excellent table grapes, that can be tasted during the annual Sagra dell'Uva (Grapes' festival) held in the month of September. Cattle breeding, as well as horse, sheep, and goat farms, are flourishing, not to mention the production of absolutely delicious typical Sicilian cheeses.

Among the notable buildings in the town are Santa Margherita, the mother church of the town, erected during the 17th century, preserving the emblem of the Santapau family on its front portal, the Chiesa del Rosario of the 18th century, and the Palazzo Municipale (Town Hall building).

History
The name Licodia derives from the Greek word 'Licos' meaning wolf, which is why its Coat-of-Arms has a picture of a wolf. The suburb belonged to lord Riccardo Filangieri, and was afterwards bestowed to nobleman Manfredi Aragona.

The name Eubea was given to the place in 1872, to identify with Chalcis, a town on Euboea, the second-largest Greek island, because it is believed to be the colony of Leontini, founded early in the 6th century BC on the same site of an unknown Sicel settlement. Vases of the First Period were found and all the tombs explored in 1898 belonged to the Fourth Period (700–500 BCE), and show the gradual process of Hellenization among the Sicels.

In 1392, the ancient castle was bestowed to the Santapau family, that gave it its name and owned it until the 16th century, when it passed under the dominion of lord Vincenzo Ruffo. In 1693, the town was devastated by the earthquake, and experienced a slow reconstruction.

In 1968, the Licodia Eubea Social Club was established in Victoria, Australia.

Twin towns
 Santa Pau, Spain
 Euboea, island in Greece

References

External links
 Official website 

Municipalities of the Metropolitan City of Catania